The Hitchhiker (also known as Deadly Nightmares in the United Kingdom and Le Voyageur in France) is a mystery horror anthology television series. It aired from 1983 to 1987 on HBO, and First Choice in Canada. The series later moved to the USA Network from 1989 to 1991.

Synopsis
Each episode is introduced and concluded by a mysterious wanderer known only as "The Hitchhiker", and explores the foibles of humanity and its dark spirit. The title character was played by Nicholas Campbell from 1983-1984 (3 episodes), and Page Fletcher from 1984-1991 (82 episodes). There were a total of 85 episodes over six seasons (39 first runs on HBO and 46 first runs on USA).

Production
The series was a United States/Canada/France co-production. It was filmed in Vancouver and Toronto, Ontario, Canada and Paris, France. The show was produced by Corazon Productions (Season 1 for a total of three episodes), Quintina Productions (Seasons 2-4 for a total of 36 episodes), and La Cinq, Atlantique & Quintina Productions (Seasons 5-6 for a total of 46 episodes).

The Hitchhiker was created by Lewis Chesler and Riff Markowitz, later joined by Richard Rothstein. The pilot episode consisted of three stories. Richard Rothstein wrote two and Jeph Loeb and Matt Weissman wrote the third.

Paul Hoffert created the theme music for the show.

Episodes

Series overview
{| class="wikitable plainrowheaders" style="text-align:center;"
|-
! colspan="2" rowspan="2" |Season
! rowspan="2" |Episodes
! colspan="2" |Originally aired
! rowspan="2" |Network
|-
! First aired
! Last aired
|-
| style="background: #F16C6C;"|
| 1
| 3
| 
| 
| rowspan="4"|HBO
|-
| style="background: #EEE8AA;"|
| 2 
| 10
| 
| 
|-
| style="background: #DA70D6;"|
| 3
| 13
| 
| 
|-
| style="background: #D2B48C;"|
| 4
| 13
| 
| 
|-
| style="background: #B0C4DE;"|
| 5
| 26
| 
| 
| rowspan="2"|USA Network
|-
| style="background: #FDA364;"|
| 6
| 20
| 
| 
|}

Season 1 (1983)

Season 2 (1984–85)

Season 3 (1985–86)

Season 4 (1987)

Season 5 (1989)
 "The Martyr" (1989-04-22)
 "In Living Color" (1989-04-29)
 "Dark Wishes" (1989-07-01)
 "Garter Belt" (1989-07-7)
 "Shadow Puppets" (1989-07-08)
 "Renaissance" (1989-07-14)
 "The Miracle of Alice Ames" (1989-07-15)
 "Code Liz" (1989-07-21)
 "Her Finest Hour" (1989-07-22)
 "Together Forever" (1989-07-28)
 "Phantom Zone" (1989-08-04)
 "Spinning Wheel" (1989-08-05)
 "Square Deal" (1989-08-11)
 "Part of Me" (1989-08-12)
 "Fashion Exchange" (1989-08-18)
 "Hootch" (1989-09-16)
 "Coach" (1989-09-30)
 "The Verdict" (1989-11-04)
 "Hit and Run" (1989-11-10)
 "Studio 3X" (1989-11-11)
 "Striptease" (1989-11-17)
 "The Cruelest Cut" (1989-11-18)
 "The Dying Generation" (1989-11-24)
 "My Enemy" (1989-11-25)
 "Power Play" (1989-12-09)
 "Pawns" (1989-12-16)

Season 6 (1990–91)
 "Fading Away" (1990-09-21)
 "Tough Guys Don't Whine" (1990-09-28)
 "Riding the Nightmare" (1990-10-05)
 "Strate Shooter" (1990-10-12)
 "Hard Rhyme" (1990-10-19)
 "Toxic Shock" (1990-10-26)
 "New Dawn" (1990-11-02)
 "A Function of Control" (1990-11-09)
 "Trust Me" (1990-11-16)
 "Windows" (1990-11-23)
 "Working Girl" (1990-11-30)
 "White Slaves" (1990-12-07)
 "Tourist Trap" (1990-12-14)
 "Homecoming" (1991-01-11)
 "Living a Lie" (1991-01-18)
 "Made in Paris" (1991-01-25)
 "A Whole New You" (1991-02-01)
 "Offspring" (1991-02-08)
 "Secrets" (1991-02-15)
 "New Blood" (1991-02-22)

Cast
Like the much earlier Twilight Zone series, with which it had a lot of other commonalities, The Hitchhiker served as starting point for many actors, some of whom would go on to gain greater recognition elsewhere. Notable cast members (in alphabetical order):

 Kirstie Alley: Angelica in "Out of the Night" (1985), Jane L. in "The Legendary Billy B." (1987)
 Sandra Bernhard: Rat in "O.D. Feelin" (1986)
 Rachel Blanchard: Karen O'Neill in "Riding the Nightmare" (1990)
 Karen Black: Kay in "Hired Help" (1985)
 Susan Blakely: Melody in "Remembering Melody" (1984)
 Timothy Bottoms: Peter in "Joker" (1987)
 Melissa Brennan: Denise in "Homebodies" (1987)
 Gary Busey: Reverend Nolan Powers in "W.G.O.D." (1985)
 Robert Carradine: Frank in "Garter Belt" (1989)
 Christopher Collet: Jimmy in "Homebodies" (1987)
 Peter Coyote: Alex in "Last Scene" (1985)
 Willem Dafoe: Jeffrey Hunt in "Ghostwriter" (1985)
 Joe Dallesandro: Julien in "Fashion Exchange" (1988)
 Michael Des Barres: The Wise Man in "O.D. Feelin" (1986)
 Brad Dourif: Billy B. in "The Legendary Billy B." (1987)
 Louise Fletcher: Mother Birch in "Offspring" (1991)
 Zach Galligan: Dick Raskin in "Toxic Shock" (1990)
 John Glover: Miles Duchet in "Striptease" (1989)
 Elliott Gould: Augie Benson in "A Whole New You" (1990)
 Erin Gray: Leslie in "Together Forever" (1989)
 Bruce Greenwood: Jeff Boder in "Shattered Vows" (1983)
 Antony Hamilton: Jim Buckley in "Man of Her Dreams" (1986)
 Lisa Hartman Black: Cheryl in "Her Finest Hour" (1989)
 Jill Hennessy: Marla Cross in "Striptease" (1989), Elisabeth in "Pawns" (1989)
 C. Thomas Howell: Gerald Brumner in "White Slaves" (1990)
 Helen Hunt: Donette in "Why are You Here?" (1987)
 Lauren Hutton: Tess O'Neill in "Riding the Nightmare" (1987)
 Claude Jade: Monique in "Windows" (1990)
 Margot Kidder: Janie in "Nightshift" (1986)
 Klaus Kinski: Kurt Hoffmann in "Love Sounds" (1985)
 Lorenzo Lamas: Tom Astor in "Trust Me" (1990)
 Audrey Landers: Priscilla Packard in "Split Decision" (1983)
 Judy Landers: Frances Packard in "Split Decision" (1983) 
 Kelly Lynch: Theresa/Melissa in "Joker" (1987)
 Michael Madsen: John Hampton in "The Man at the Window" (1985)
 Virginia Madsen: Christina in "Perfect Order" (1987)
 David Marshall Grant: Jake in "Windows" (1990)
 Darren McGavin: Old Man in "Nightshift" (1986)
 Belinda Montgomery: Carla Magnuson in "The Man at the Window" (1985)
 Carrie-Anne Moss: Lookalike in "My Enemy" (1989)
 Ornella Muti: Sister Teresa in "True Believer" (1987)
 Franco Nero: Dr. Peter Milne in "Murderous Feelings" (1985)
 Jerry Orbach: Cameron in "Cabin Fever" (1987)
 Geraldine Page: Lynette in "W.G.O.D." (1985)
 Joe Pantoliano: Brother Charles in "The Miracle of Alice Ames" (1988)
 Bill Paxton: Trout in "Made for Each Other" (1987)
 James Remar: Ron in "Homebodies" (1987)
 August Schellenberg: Bob Ames in "When Morning Comes" (1983)
 Michael Schoeffling: Lance in "Dead Man's Curve" (1986)
 Jenny Seagrove: Meg in "Killer" (1985)
 Gene Simmons: Mr. Big in "O.D. Feelin" (1986)
 Tom Skerritt: Detective in "True Believer" (1985)
 Alexandra Stewart: Jackie Winslow in "Shattered Vows" (1983)
 Alan Thicke: Mickey Black in "Tough Guys Don't Whine" (1990)
 Shannon Tweed: Barbara in "Videodate" (1984), Dr. Rita de Roy in "Doctor's Orders" (1987)
 Robert Vaughn: Dr. Christopher Hamilton in "Face to Face" (1984)
 Fred Ward: Luther Redman in "Dead Heat" (1987)
 Alberta Watson: Jill Friedlander in "Remembering Melody" (1984)
 Bruce Weitz: Ray in "Hit and Run" (1989)
 Vincent Grass: Police Officer in "White Slaves", "Part of Me" and "The Miracle of Alice Ames" (1989)
 Olivier Rabourdin: Denis LeBreaux in "A Whole New You" (1991)

Syndication
In 1995, The Hitchhiker entered syndication. To make the HBO episodes suitable for US broadcast television, edits were made, both for content (to remove nudity/gore/adult language) and for running time, to get them down to the standard 22-minute length needed to insert commercials. Reruns in foreign markets, such as Canada and Europe, often still contained the nudity/language/gore.

After 1983 (but prior to the 1995 syndication), the first three episodes had footage edited and/or re-shot to replace Nicholas Campbell with Page Fletcher, in order to preserve continuity during reruns. The Hitchhiker was syndicated by Rysher Entertainment (since absorbed by CBS Television Distribution) up until 2000.

Home media
Lorimar Home Video released four VHS volumes of HBO episodes to the rental market in 1987 (a trade ad for the first two volumes confirms those were also released on Beta format). Volume 1 contained "W.G.O.D", "The Curse" and "Hired Help". Volume 2 consisted of "Nightshift", "Dead Man's Curve" and "Perfect Order". The third volume had "Ghostwriter", "And If We Dream" and "True Believer". The final Lorimar tape had "Videodate", "Man's Best Friend" and "Face to Face". These four volumes were also issued on laserdisc the following year.

Budget label Goodtimes Home Video also released a single VHS volume containing three of the USA Network episodes in 1989. That tape contained "Her Finest Hour", "In Living Color" and "My Enemy".

HBO Home Video released a three-volume set on DVD between 2004–2006, featuring various episodes from the series. The two-disc, three-volume sets contain a selection of 30 episodes, most from the HBO-produced episodes but also including some that were made for the USA Network. 

In Australia, Volumes 1 and 2 were issued together in a single set, but instead of 20 episodes, the Australian set consists of only 17, leaving out "The Legendary Billy B.", "A Whole New You" and "Dead Heat". 

In the United Kingdom, only the first HBO volume was released. This particular release contained nine episodes instead of 10. As with the Australian set, "The Legendary Billy B." is omitted from this release.

In Canada, Koch Entertainment (now known as Entertainment One) released Canadian seasons 1 and 3 (which correspond to US Seasons 1-3 and 5, respectively) on DVD in 2004. On October 18, 2005, Koch released The Complete Fourth Season (which corresponds to US Season 6). According to Koch, the reason Canadian Season 2 (US Season 4) was not released was due to them not being able to find out who owned the Canadian distribution rights to those particular episodes.

Alliance Home Entertainment released The Hitchhiker: The Complete Collection on DVD in Canada for the very first time on October 11, 2011. "The Complete Collection" is a bit misleading in that this does not contain all episodes (or even all of the HBO episodes). What is "complete" is that this release combines the three previously-released HBO Home Video volumes into one set.

Between the three HBO volumes and the Canadian season sets, all episodes of the show were released on home video except for "Minuteman" and "Doctor's Orders" (both of which came from US Season 4).

Awards and nominations

References

External links 
 Official site at HBO.com
 
 
 Profile and photograph of Michel Rubini (one of the composers of the TV series soundtrack score)

HBO original programming
1980s Canadian science fiction television series
1990s Canadian science fiction television series
1980s Canadian drama television series
1990s Canadian drama television series
1983 Canadian television series debuts
1991 Canadian television series endings
1980s American science fiction television series
1980s American drama television series
1990s American drama television series
1983 American television series debuts
1991 American television series endings
1980s American anthology television series
1980s Canadian anthology television series
French anthology television series
English-language television shows
USA Network original programming
Fiction about hitchhiking
Television shows filmed in Toronto
Television shows filmed in Vancouver